Belmar is a borough in Monmouth County, in the U.S. state of New Jersey, situated on the Jersey Shore. As of the 2020 United States census, the borough's population was 5,907, an increase of 113 (+2.0%) from the 2010 census count of 5,794, which in turn reflected a decline of 251 (−4.2%) from the 6,045 counted in the 2000 census.

What is now Belmar was originally incorporated as Ocean Beach borough by an act of the New Jersey Legislature on April 9, 1885, from portions of Wall Township, based on the results of a referendum held two days earlier. On April 16, 1889, it became the City of Elcho borough, which lasted for a few weeks until the name was changed to the City of Belmar Borough on May 14, 1889. The city acquired its current name, Borough of Belmar, on November 20, 1890. The borough's name means "beautiful sea" in Italian.

Geography

According to the United States Census Bureau, the borough had a total area of 1.62 square miles (4.18 km2), including 1.05 square miles (2.71 km2) of land and 0.57 square miles (1.48 km2) of water (35.19%).

Belmar borders the Atlantic Ocean to the east, and the Monmouth County municipalities of Avon-by-the-Sea to the north, Neptune Township to the northwest, Wall Township to the west, and Lake Como and Spring Lake to the south.

Demographics

2010 census

The Census Bureau's 2006–2010 American Community Survey showed that (in 2010 inflation-adjusted dollars) median household income was $59,928 (with a margin of error of +/− $6,993) and the median family income was $59,929 (+/− $10,255). Males had a median income of $52,215 (+/− $4,278) versus $44,453 (+/− $11,259) for females. The per capita income for the borough was $35,223 (+/− $4,105). About 9.2% of families and 12.8% of the population were below the poverty line, including 16.6% of those under age 18 and 10.6% of those age 65 or over.

2000 census

As of the 2000 United States census there were 6,045 people, 2,946 households, and 1,316 families residing in the borough. The population density was 5,921.7 people per square mile (2,288.2/km2). There were 3,996 housing units at an average density of 3,914.5 per square mile (1,512.6/km2). The racial makeup of the borough was 91.53% White, 3.46% Black, 0.18% Native American, 1.03% Asian, 1.99% from other races, and 1.82% from two or more races. Hispanic or Latino of any race were 6.85% of the population.

As of the 2000 Census, 28.2% of Belmar's residents were of Irish ancestry, the 12th highest of any municipality in New Jersey, for all communities in which at least 1,000 people listed their ancestry.

There were 2,946 households, out of which 17.2% had children under the age of 18 living with them, 32.0% were married couples living together, 9.0% had a female householder with no husband present, and 55.3% were non-families. 44.3% of all households were made up of individuals, and 12.1% had someone living alone who was 65 years of age or older. The average household size was 2.05 and the average family size was 2.92.

In the borough the population was spread out, with 17.2% under the age of 18, 7.6% from 18 to 24, 36.7% from 25 to 44, 22.7% from 45 to 64, and 15.7% who were 65 years of age or older. The median age was 38 years. For every 100 females, there were 99.8 males. For every 100 females age 18 and over, there were 99.2 males.

The median income for a household in the borough was $44,896, and the median income for a family was $61,250. Males had a median income of $40,557 versus $34,323 for females. The per capita income for the borough was $29,456. About 4.5% of families and 8.6% of the population were below the poverty line, including 11.3% of those under age 18 and 7.9% of those age 65 or over.

Parks and recreation

Belmar is a popular vacation destination because of its natural and recreational resources and close proximity to New York and Philadelphia. It features wide beaches for sunbathing, surfing, swimming, and fishing. The boardwalk and town offer shops, restaurants, an active arts scene, sporting events, festivals, and a variety of family-oriented activities (see "Annual Events" below). Belmar sits on the south side of the Shark River and boasts a large municipal marina in the bay and on the inlet itself, including the only private marina in town, Seaport Inlet Marina.

Belmar beach (as well as those of municipalities to the south, such as Manasquan and Point Pleasant) is among the most popular surf spots on the East Coast. Belmar frequently hosts surfing events and competitions.  Along with surfing, Belmar also has an active skate community and skatepark constructed by American Ramp Company.  The Jersey Shore Basketball League, a competitive summer basketball league, takes place at St. Rose High School every summer.

The Belmar Arts Council (BAC) sponsors regular art shows, workshops, concerts, and performances year around. BAC's gallery and workshop, the Boatworks, is located at 608 River Road, Belmar, around the corner from Klein's Seafood Restaurant near the Shark River Inlet.

Government

Local government
In July 1990, the voters of Belmar overwhelmingly passed a referendum changing Belmar's form of government from a three-person, non-partisan commission form of government under the Walsh Act to the Small Municipality plan 3 form of government under the Faulkner Act. This referendum followed nine months of research, analysis and hearings by a Charter Study Commission elected by the residents at a referendum that passed in November 1989 and implemented effective January 1, 1991. The borough is one of 18 municipalities (of the 564) statewide that use this form of government, which is only available to municipalities with fewer than 12,000 residents at the time of adoption.

Under the version of the Small Municipality Plan form applicable to Belmar, the Borough Council is comprised of four members who are elected for staggered, three-year terms at partisan elections each year as part of the November general election, with either one or two seats up for vote in a three-year cycle. The Mayor is directly elected by the voters for a four-year term and serves as Belmar's chief executive officer, overseeing the day-to-day operations of the Borough. The Mayor sits as a member of the council, chairs Council meetings and is able to vote as a member of the council, but has no veto over the council's actions.

, the Mayor of Belmar is Democrat Gerald Buccafusco, whose term of office ends December 31, 2026. Members of the Belmar Borough Council are Thomas Brennan (D, 2023), Jodi Kinney (R, 2023), Mark Levis (D, 2025) and Maria Rondinaro (D, 2025).

Federal, state and county representation
Belmar is located in the 4th Congressional District and is part of New Jersey's 30th state legislative district. Prior to the 2011 reapportionment following the 2010 Census, Belmar had been in the 11th state legislative district.

 

Monmouth County is governed by a Board of County Commissioners comprised of five members who are elected at-large to serve three year terms of office on a staggered basis, with either one or two seats up for election each year as part of the November general election. At an annual reorganization meeting held in the beginning of January, the board selects one of its members to serve as Director and another as Deputy Director. , Monmouth County's Commissioners are
Commissioner Director Thomas A. Arnone (R, Neptune City, term as commissioner and as director ends December 31, 2022), 
Commissioner Deputy Director Susan M. Kiley (R, Hazlet Township, term as commissioner ends December 31, 2024; term as deputy commissioner director ends 2022),
Lillian G. Burry (R, Colts Neck Township, 2023),
Nick DiRocco (R, Wall Township, 2022), and 
Ross F. Licitra (R, Marlboro Township, 2023). 
Constitutional officers elected on a countywide basis are
County clerk Christine Giordano Hanlon (R, 2025; Ocean Township), 
Sheriff Shaun Golden (R, 2022; Howell Township) and 
Surrogate Rosemarie D. Peters (R, 2026; Middletown Township).

Politics

As of March 2011, there were a total of 3,823 registered voters in Belmar, of which 1,074 (28.1%) were registered as Democrats, 765 (20.0%) were registered as Republicans and 1,982 (51.8%) were registered as Unaffiliated. There were two voters registered as either Libertarians or Greens.

In the 2012 presidential election, Republican Mitt Romney received 51.5% of the vote (1,310 cast), ahead of Democrat Barack Obama with 47.0% (1,196 votes), and other candidates with 1.4% (36 votes), among the 2,584 ballots cast by the borough's 4,011 registered voters (42 ballots were spoiled), for a turnout of 64.4%. In the 2008 presidential election, Republican John McCain received 49.5% of the vote (1,389 cast), ahead of Democrat Barack Obama with 47.4% (1,332 votes) and other candidates with 1.6% (44 votes), among the 2,808 ballots cast by the borough's 3,938 registered voters, for a turnout of 71.3%. In the 2004 presidential election, Republican George W. Bush received 50.4% of the vote (1,394 ballots cast), outpolling Democrat John Kerry with 48.0% (1,327 votes) and other candidates with 0.8% (32 votes), among the 2,764 ballots cast by the borough's 4,014 registered voters, for a turnout percentage of 68.9.

In the 2013 gubernatorial election, Republican Chris Christie received 70.6% of the vote (1,440 cast), ahead of Democrat Barbara Buono with 27.2% (555 votes), and other candidates with 2.2% (45 votes), among the 2,096 ballots cast by the borough's 4,043 registered voters (56 ballots were spoiled), for a turnout of 51.8%. In the 2009 gubernatorial election, Republican Chris Christie received 57.4% of the vote (1,173 ballots cast), ahead of  Democrat Jon Corzine with 34.0% (694 votes), Independent Chris Daggett with 6.8% (138 votes) and other candidates with 1.0% (20 votes), among the 2,044 ballots cast by the borough's 3,698 registered voters, yielding a 55.3% turnout.

Education
The Belmar School District serves students in public school for pre-kindergarten through eighth grade at Belmar Elementary School. As of the 2020–21 school year, the district, comprised of one school, had an enrollment of 448 students and 52.8 classroom teachers (on an FTE basis), for a student–teacher ratio of 8.5:1. The district also serves students from Lake Como who attend as part of a sending/receiving relationship. The school was constructed in 1909 and has had additions built in 1929, 1949, 1969 and 1993. There are 61 certified staff members, including the district's administrators, teachers, nurses and child study team personnel, with an additional 12 paraprofessionals. The single school facility is two schools in one, a primary school for Pre-K–5 and a middle school structure for 6–8.

Students attending public high school for ninth through twelfth grades are assigned to either Manasquan High School or Asbury Park High School based on sending/receiving relationships with the Manasquan Public Schools and Asbury Park Public Schools, respectively. Manasquan High School also serves students from Avon-by-the-Sea, Brielle, Lake Como, Sea Girt, Spring Lake, Spring Lake Heights who attend as part of sending/receiving relationships with their respective districts. As of the 2020–21 school year, Manasquan High School had an enrollment of 1,006 students and 76.9 classroom teachers (on an FTE basis), for a student–teacher ratio of 13.1:1, while Asbury Park High School had an enrollment of 682 students and 54.5 classroom teachers (on an FTE basis), for a student–teacher ratio of 12.5:1.

Students may also attend Red Bank Regional High School, Marine Academy of Science and Technology, Academy of Allied Health & Science, Academy Charter School, High Technology High School, Communications High School or Biotechnology High School.

Students also have the option to attend Academy Charter High School in Lake Como, which accepts students on a lottery basis from the communities of Allenhurst, Asbury Park, Avon-by-the-Sea, Belmar, Bradley Beach, Deal, Interlaken and Lake Como.

Belmar is home of St. Rose High School, which was established in 1923 by the local parish and the Sisters of St. Joseph, and operates under the auspices of the Roman Catholic Diocese of Trenton.

Mesivta Keser Torah of Central Jersey, a yeshiva and high school for men that serves Haredi students mainly from Lakewood Township, Deal and Brooklyn, has been in the borough since the 1920s.

The Belmar Public Library is one of New Jersey's original 36 Carnegie libraries.

Transportation

Roads and highways

Route 35 and Route 71 are the two main roads that pass through Belmar. The closest limited access roads are all in neighboring Wall Township: Route 18, the Garden State Parkway and Interstate 195.

Public transportation

NJ Transit provides rail transportation at the Belmar station to and from Penn Station in Midtown Manhattan, Newark Penn Station and Hoboken Terminal on the North Jersey Coast Line. New Jersey Transit also provides bus transportation between Belmar and Philadelphia on the 317 route and service on the 830 route.

Airport
Monmouth Executive Airport is a public-use airport located west of Belmar.

Annual events

 Belmar 5 Mile Johnny Cobb Memorial Run
 New Jersey Seafood Festival celebrated its 30th year in 2016. The festival, which attracted an estimated 200,000 visitors in 2015, had to be modified in scope to allow the borough to cope with the volumes of traffic.
 New Jersey Sand Castle Contest, which featured 200 participants at the 27th annual event in 2013
 St. Patrick's Day Parade
 Belmar Pro Surf Contest
 Belmar Fall Festival
 Belmar Holiday Tree Lighting Ceremony
 Belmar Spring Kite Festival
 Howard Rowland Memorial Lifeguard Tournament – an annual tournament of lifeguard teams from the Jersey Shore
 Belmar Mile Swim
 Belmar Sprint Triathlon
 The Jersey Shore Relay Run, which has a leg that goes through Belmar
 Surfer's Healing

Sister city
In August 2008, the borough established a Sister City relationship with Balbriggan, a town of nearly 16,000 in County Dublin, Ireland.

Community

 Belmar is home to the first and oldest first-aid squad in the United States.
 Belmar's "E" Street is the original source of Bruce Springsteen's "E Street Band". Springsteen's original keyboardist, David Sancious, was a resident of E Street in Belmar at the time the band was formed.  The Sancious' family home was often used as a practice venue where they honed their musical craft in the formative pre-fame years.
 Monmouth Executive Airport in nearby Wall Township is designated with the call letters "BLM" based on its initial name of Belmar Airport.
 In the HBO series The Sopranos, Belmar is shown as the home port of Tony Soprano's boat, the Stugots.
 Guy Fieri featured Belmar and local restaurant 10th Avenue Burrito in an episode of Food Network's Diners, Drive-Ins, and Dives which originally aired on December 13, 2010.

Climate

According to the Köppen climate classification system, Belmar, New Jersey has a humid subtropical climate (Cfa). Cfa climates are characterized by all months having an average mean temperature > 32.0 °F (> 0.0 °C), at least four months with an average mean temperature ≥ 50.0 °F (≥ 10.0 °C), at least one month with an average mean temperature ≥ 71.6 °F (≥ 22.0 °C) and no significant precipitation difference between seasons. During the summer months at Belmar, a cooling afternoon  sea breeze is present on most days, but episodes of extreme heat and humidity can occur with heat index values ≥ 95 °F (≥ 35 °C). On average, the wettest month of the year is July which corresponds with the annual peak in thunderstorm activity. During the winter months, episodes of extreme cold and wind can occur with wind chill values < 0 °F (< −18 °C). The plant hardiness zone at Belmar Beach is 7a with an average annual extreme minimum air temperature of 3.8 °F (−15.7 °C).

Ecology
According to the A. W. Kuchler U.S. potential natural vegetation types, Belmar, New Jersey would have an Appalachian Oak (104) vegetation type with an Eastern Hardwood Forest (25) vegetation form.

Notable people

People who were born in, residents of, or otherwise closely associated with Belmar include:

 Jay Alders (born 1973), artist and photographer
 Tom Brower (born 1965), member of the Hawaii House of Representatives
 Dave Calloway (born 1968), college basketball coach and the former head men's basketball coach at Monmouth University
 Harriett Ephrussi-Taylor (1918–1968), geneticist, microbiologist and educator, who initiated and made crucial contributions to the fields of transformation and bacterial recombination.
 Christian Fuscarino (born ), community organizer and LGBT activist who is the executive director of Garden State Equality
 Michael Gerson (born 1964), political writer and commentator who served as chief speechwriter for President George W. Bush from 2001 to 2006
 Stephen L. Hoffman (born 1948), physician-scientist, tropical medicine specialist and vaccinologist
 Brian Lynch (born 1978), professional basketball player who played for the Belgian team Euphony Bree and is married to former World No. 1-ranked tennis star Kim Clijsters
 Jay Lynch (1945–2017), cartoonist best known for his comic strip Nard n' Pat
 Marina Mabrey (born 1996), basketball player with the Los Angeles Sparks of the Women's National Basketball Association
 Balls Mahoney (1972–2016), professional wrestler
 Joseph Mayer (1877–1942), Mayor of Belmar who later served on the Monmouth County Board of Chosen Freeholders
 Tom McGowan (born 1956), actor
 Douglas Crawford McMurtrie (1888–1944), type designer
 Richie Rosenberg, trombonist who performed with Southside Johnny & The Asbury Jukes
 David Sancious (born 1953), early member of the E Street Band
 Sarah Spiegel, singer and actress
 Neal Sterling (born 1992), tight end who played in the NFL for the New York Jets
 E. Donald Sterner (1894–1983), politician

References

External links

 Borough of Belmar official website
 Belmar Elementary School
 School Data for the Belmar Elementary School, National Center for Education Statistics
 

 
1885 establishments in New Jersey
Boroughs in Monmouth County, New Jersey
Faulkner Act (small municipality)
Jersey Shore communities in Monmouth County
Populated places established in 1885